The Colgate European Open was a women's professional golf tournament on the LPGA Tour from 1974 to 1979. It was an unofficial event in 1974 and 1975. It was played at the Sunningdale Golf Club in Berkshire, England.

Winners
Colgate European Open
1979 Nancy Lopez
1978 Nancy Lopez

Colgate European Women's Open
1977 Judy Rankin

Colgate European Open
1976 Hisako "Chako" Higuchi

As unofficial event
1975 Donna Caponi
1974 Judy Rankin

References

Former LPGA Tour events
Golf tournaments in England
Sport in Berkshire